Oliver Elementary School may refer to:

 EE Oliver School, Fairview, Alberta
 School District 53 Okanagan Similkameen, a school district with its board office located in Oliver, British Columbia, Canada